Duplex aarviki is a moth of the family Erebidae first described by Michael Fibiger in 2008. It is known from north and north-west Sumatra, southern West Malaysia and south-western Thailand.

Adults have been found in February, June and July, suggesting multiple generations per year. The habitat consists of lowland forests.

The wingspan is 7.5-9.5 mm. The forewing is relatively narrow, with a bright, ovoid, yellow reniform stigma. All crosslines are present and black. The antemedial line is prominent, sharply angled subcostally, then slightly curving. The postmedial and subterminal lines are also prominent and slightly waved. The terminal line is marked by tight black interveinal spots. The hindwing is dark grey, without a discal spot. The underside of the forewing is dark grey and the underside of the hindwing is light grey, with a discal spot.

References

Micronoctuini
Taxa named by Michael Fibiger
Moths described in 2008